Chand Baori is a stepwell situated in the village of Abhaneri in the Indian state of Rajasthan. It extends approximately 30m (100ft) into the ground, making it one of the deepest and largest stepwells in India.

History 
Chand Baori is said to be named after a local ruler of Nikumbh dynasty called Raja Chanda. However, no epigraphic evidence has been found regarding the construction of the Chand Baori or the adjoining Harshat Mata Temple. Based on similarities in style and carvings with the terraced temples of Paranagar and Mandore, the Baori can be dated to 8th-9th century. It was likely constructed before the temple.  According to Morna Livingston in Steps to Water: The Ancient Stepwells of India, Chand Baori is one of the few stepwells that has "two classical periods of water building in a single setting".

The oldest parts of the step-well date from the 8th century onwards. An upper palace building was added to the site, which is viewed from the tabulated arches used by the Chauhan rulers. Adjoining the baori is the architecturally splendid and sculpturally beautiful Harshat Mata Temple, which was built between the 7th-8th century, but was destroyed and damaged by Mahmud Ghazni. Many of its pillars, columns, statues now lie scattered. The Mughals also destroyed the Baori interior sculptures. Today, there are remains of old sculptures and carvings, which were suggested to be in the temple or in the various rooms. The nearby temple of Harshat Mata, goddess of joy, was a pilgrimage site and formed a complex together alongside the well. 

Many of these stepwells, including Chand Baori, served multiple purposes alongside drawing water and playing a significant role in religious or ceremonial activities. Pilgrims are said to have found comfort in quenching their thirst and finding a resting spot at the steps of Chand Baori after their long travels. This unique form of underground well-architecture remains constant from the 7th century in the existing monument. Excavated stones of the temple are now kept by the Archaeological Survey of India in the arcades of the well. Chand Baori is a significant architectural site in western India.

Overview 
Chand Baori is a deep four-sided well with a large temple located in the back of the well. The basic architectural aspects of the monumental well consist of a long corridor of steps leading to five or six stories below ground level which can be seen at the site. Chand Baori consists of 3,500 narrow steps over 13 stories. The state of Rajasthan is extremely arid, and the design and final structure of Chand Baori were intended to conserve as much water as possible. 

Ancient Indian scriptures made references to construction of wells, canals, tanks and dams and their efficient operation and maintenance. This site combined many of these operations to allow for easy access to local water. At the bottom of the well, the air remains 5-6°C  cooler than at the surface, and Chand Baori was used as a community gathering place for locals during periods of intense heat. One side of the well has a haveli pavilion and resting room for the royals.

In media 
Chand Baori has been used as a filming location for a number of films, such as Bhoomi, The Fall, Bhool Bhulaiyaa, and Paheli. The 2012 Hollywood movie The Dark Knight Rises starring Christian Bale as Batman used Chand Baori as inspiration for one of its production sets but was not actually filmed on location at Chand Baori.

Images

References

External links 

 Homepage

9th-century establishments in India
Buildings and structures completed in the 9th century
Stepwells in Rajasthan
Tourist attractions in Dausa district